Ahmed Sheikh Ali Ahmed ( (أحمد شيخ علي أحمد ) ) is a Somali intellectual and author.

He has written various books, mainly concerning the history of Somali law.

Education

Career

Bibliography
Burale has mostly written on Somali traditional customs. His book about Somali customary laws was translated into English by Mohamed Mohamed Sheikh. Among his works are:

Xeerkii Soomaalidii Hore (The Somali customary laws), 1977, Mogadishu, 2002, Mogadishu, 2008 Addis Ababa, 2010 Nairobi.
Jookha Jookha "Dawladdii Jiniga ee Soomaaliya", 2009 Nairobi.

References

1937 births
Somalian writers
Living people
Somali National Front politicians
Somali-language writers